The 1902 college football season had no clear-cut champion, with the Official NCAA Division I Football Records Book listing Michigan and Yale as having been selected national champions.

Conference and program changes

Conference changes
One conference began play in 1902: 
Ohio Athletic Conference – now a Division III conference

Membership changes

Conference standings

Major conference standings

Independents

Minor conferences

Minor conference standings

Awards and honors

All-Americans

The consensus All-America team included:

Statistical leaders
Team scoring most points: Michigan, 644
Player scoring most points: Albert E. Herrnstein, Michigan, 130
Rushing leader: Willie Heston, Michigan, 487
Rushing avg leader: Willie Heston, 8.7
Rushing touchdowns leader: Al Herrnstein, 26

References